Parliamentary appointments were held in Ghana in 1965. As the country was a one-party state at the time, no parties except President Kwame Nkrumah's Convention People's Party (CPP), were allowed to participate. All candidates were appointed by the President and his party.

Background
Due to a constitutional amendment passed by the CPP majority and a referendum the previous year, the CPP had become the sole legal party. All other parties were banned.  It was the first vote for the country's parliament since the pre-independence 1956 legislative elections; Nkrumah's victory in the 1960 constitutional referendum was taken by the President and his party as a fresh mandate from the people and the terms of National Assembly members were extended for another five years.

Results
As Ghana was now a one-party state, all 198 MPs representing the CPP were appointed by the president and elected unopposed.

Aftermath
Nkrumah was overthrown in a coup in February 1966, the CPP was dissolved, and the constitution suspended. The conversion of the country's governance system was one of the major reasons for the 1966 coup. Multi-party politics was restored by the time of the next elections in 1969.

See also
List of the CPP MPs appointed in the 1965 Ghanaian parliamentary election

References

Elections in Ghana
Ghana
Parliamentary
One-party elections
Single-candidate elections